Máximo Soto Gómez (born 11 May 1949) is a Mexican politician from the National Action Party. From 2000 to 2003 he served as Deputy of the LVIII Legislature of the Mexican Congress representing the Federal District.

References

1949 births
Living people
Politicians from Mexico City
Members of the Chamber of Deputies (Mexico)
National Action Party (Mexico) politicians
21st-century Mexican politicians
Instituto Politécnico Nacional alumni